Miranda Devine (born 1 July 1961) is an Australian columnist and writer, now based in New York City. She hosted The Miranda Devine Show on Sydney radio station 2GB until it ended in 2015. She has written columns for Fairfax Media newspapers The Sydney Morning Herald and The Sun-Herald, and for News Limited newspapers Daily Telegraph, Sunday Telegraph, Melbourne's Sunday Herald Sun, and Perth's Sunday Times. As of 2022, she writes for the New York Post. Some of her political opinion pieces and statements on race, gender, and the environment have been the subject of public scrutiny and debate.

Early life and education
She is the eldest daughter of Frank Devine, a New Zealand-born Australian newspaper editor and journalist, who died in 2009. She attended school at Loreto Kirribilli in Sydney and the International School of the Sacred Heart in Tokyo. She has a Master of Science in journalism from Northwestern University (USA) and a Bachelor of Science in mathematics from Macquarie University. Devine studied first-year architecture at the University of Sydney, where she was a resident at Sancta Sophia College and worked briefly at the CSIRO's Division of Textile Physics.

Career
Devine worked for the Boston Herald as a reporter and feature writer. In 1989, Devine joined The Daily Telegraph as assistant editor, police reporter, and columnist after returning to Australia to live in Sydney. She had also previously worked at the British tabloid the Sun and the British newspaper Sunday Times in London. Most recently, Devine's columns, focused on United States politics, are published by the New York Post and she makes appearances promoting her articles on local media outlets. Devine formerly lived in Sydney with her husband and two sons. Devine is the author of the book Laptop from Hell: Hunter Biden, Big Tech, and the Dirty Secrets the President Tried to Hide.

Commentary 
Devine takes a conservative stance on a range of social and political issues. In April 2016, she coined the term "delcon" (delusional conservative) to describe conservatives who remained loyal to Tony Abbott after the Liberal Party ousted him in favour of Malcolm Turnbull.

Race 
In 2002, Devine opined in the Sydney Morning Herald that the racial element of the Sydney gang rapes had been "airbrushed" out of the media coverage of the events. She stated that the victims alleged that prosecutors had intentionally "censored" their official statements to remove any mention of racially sensitive material. Devine has also been accused by The Guardian and The Sydney Morning Herald of promoting the white genocide conspiracy theory and has been described as pivotal in popularising the concept within Australian politics. Referring to white South African refugees as "oppressed white, Christian, industrious, rugby and cricket-playing Commonwealth cousins", she has claimed they would "integrate seamlessly" with European Australians.

Environment 
Devine suggested in 2009 that conservationists were to blame for the poor management of forested areas and national parks, and consequently for the deaths during the Black Saturday bushfires event. This rhetoric was revived during the 2019–20 Australian bushfire season, but promptly rejected by the scientific and firefighting community. In 2017, she claimed that shared bicycle schemes were a terror threat. Devine is also a climate change denier, advocating for the continuation of coal-fired electricity production and she has repeatedly stated that climate change is a political conspiracy.

Gender and LGBTIQ issues 
In 2011, Devine used the news of Australian federal government minister Penny Wong's decision to parent a child with her female partner as the basis of a column in which she argued that the 2011 riots in England were the result of a "fatherless society". Writing for ABC News, Catherine Deveny criticised Devine's claim that same-sex marriage was a "political tool to undermine the last bastion of bourgeois morality - the traditional nuclear family".  Devine sparked further controversy in 2015 after claiming that "women abusing welfare" were the main cause of domestic violence in Australia and contending "if you want to break the cycle of violence, end the welfare incentive for unsuitable women to keep having children to a string of feckless men". In 2016, Devine caused controversy by comparing the purported "vilification" of opponents of same-sex marriage in Australia to the victims of  beheadings by ISIS, saying that critics of same-sex marriage were being "brutally made examples of" by "intolerant authoritarians".

George Pell 
In 2019, Devine defended Cardinal George Pell, at the time facing charges of which he was ultimately acquitted, related to the sexual assault of two 13-year-old boys, claiming that the victim's "accusations are implausible" and that "Victoria police chief Graham Ashton desperate for a distraction from the crime epidemic he’s incapable of stopping".

Donald Trump
Devine supported US President Donald Trump. In February 2020, Devine was reported to be "over the moon" after being retweeted by Trump. In October 2020, The Guardian described her as "one of Trump's favourite writers" after the President again retweeted one of her articles. Devine drew criticism for a "fantastically fawning love letter" to Trump in which she described him as an "invincible hero" after his recovery from COVID-19 and called COVID-19 "the Chinese virus". Devine has since repeated Donald Trump's unsuccessful attempts to overturn the 2020 United States presidential election with unsubstantiated claims that Joe Biden's victory in the 2020 United States presidential election was driven by large-scale electoral fraud. In January 2021, Devine blamed past Black Lives Matter demonstrations for the actions of rioters during the 2021 storming of the United States Capitol.

Quaden Bayles
In February 2020, Devine alleged in a series of tweets that a video showing Quaden Bayles, an Indigenous boy with achondroplasia dwarfism, crying after being bullied at school, was a scam and that Bayles was actually an adult actor. That led to Quaden's mother, Yarraka, suing Devine for defamation on behalf of her son, and also suing on her own behalf over Devine's suggestion she had coached Quaden.

In September 2020, ahead of an anticipated settlement of the suit, Devine, who was on secondment at the New York Post, tweeted an apology for her allegations that the video had been faked.

Hunter Biden conspiracy
Miranda Devine has been cited as the source for a rental application of Hunter Biden's purporting to have previously paid $49,910 of rent a month at a previous property. This has been construed by Tucker Carlson, Judge Jeanine and other Fox News hosts as proof of money laundering within the Biden family.  The Fact checking website PolitiFact, points out that this claim is wrong, and that the actual property referenced is Hunter Biden's office space in the "House of Sweden" building on K Street, Washington, D.C.

References

External links
 
 

1961 births
Living people
Writers from New York City
20th-century Roman Catholics
21st-century Roman Catholics
Australian columnists
Australian Roman Catholics
Australian conspiracy theorists
Female critics of feminism
Macquarie University alumni
Australian women columnists
Fox News people
New York Post people